David Bondelevitch is an American sound editor and re-recording mixer. He won Primetime Emmy Award Outstanding Sound Editing for a Miniseries, Movie or a Special for The Hunley in 2000.

Life and career
Bondelevitch was born in Swampscott, Massachusetts. He holds bachelor's degrees from both Berklee College of Music and the Massachusetts Institute of Technology, as well an MFA in film production from the University of Southern California. He began teaching at USC School of Cinematic Arts in 1993, where he was an assistant professor until 2008. He was president of the Motion Picture Sound Editors in 2004–2005. He is on the board of the Cinema Audio Society, board member of Motion Picture Sound Editors and Associate Professor of Recording Arts at the University of Colorado Denver.

Selected filmography
 2019 - El Vacio, Re-recording mixer and dialogue editor
 2019 - Fresh Tracks, Re-recording mixer and sound designer
 2018 - Empty Net, Re-recording mixer
 2016 - Jimmy Vestvood: Amerikan Hero, Re-recording mixer and supervising sound editor
 2016 - Southwest of Salem: The Story of the San Antonio Four, Re-recording mixer
 2013 - Driven to Ride, Re-recording mixer and supervising sound editor
 2011 - Above the Ashes, Re-recording mixer, sound editor and supervising sound editor
 2009 - The Six Wives of Henry Lefay, Music editor
 2007 - State of Mind, Music editor
 2001 - Ruby's Bucket of Blood, Music editor
 1999 - The Hunley, Music editor
 1999 - Island of the Sharks, Music editor

Awards and nominations

References

External links

David's official blog
University of Colorado Denver – Faculty Information

Year of birth missing (living people)
Living people
Re-recording mixers
American sound editors